Thorah Township is a former municipality that today is a geographic township in the municipality of Brock, Regional Municipality of Durham in Central Ontario, Canada.

History
The origin of the name is unclear; it may have been named for the Pentateuch, the first five books of the Bible, known to those in the Jewish faith as the Torah. The Township was incorporated in 1850 and transferred to Ontario County upon its formation in 1852. The Village of Beaverton, originally part of the township, was incorporated as a separate municipality in 1884.

Part of the Trent–Severn Waterway was constructed through the northern portion of the Township and opened in 1907.

With the creation of Durham Region in 1974, Thorah was amalgamated with then-Brock Township and the Villages of Beaverton and Cannington to create an expanded Township of Brock.

See also
List of townships in Ontario

References

Former municipalities in Ontario
Geographic townships in Ontario
Communities in the Regional Municipality of Durham
1820 establishments in Canada
Populated places disestablished in 1974